An election to Essex County Council took place on 2 May 1985 as part of the 1985 United Kingdom local elections. 98 councillors were elected from various electoral divisions, which returned either one or two county councillors each by first-past-the-post voting for a four-year term of office.

Summary

Results

|-bgcolor=#F6F6F6
| colspan=2 style="text-align: right; margin-right: 1em" | Total
| style="text-align: right;" | 98
| colspan=5 |
| style="text-align: right;" | 442547
| style="text-align: right;" | 
|-
|}

Results by Electoral Divisions

Basildon

District Summary

Division Results

Braintree

District Summary

Division Results

Brentwood

District Summary

Division Results

Castle Point

District Summary

Division Results

Chelmsford

District Summary

Division Results

Colchester

District Summary

Division Results

No Ecology candidate as previous (-6.4).

No Ecology candidate as previous (-6.0).

Epping Forest

District Summary

Division Results

Harlow

District Summary

Division Results

Maldon

District Summary

Division Results

Rochford

District Summary

Division Results

Southend

Tendring

Thurrock

Uttlesford

References

Essex County Council elections
1985 English local elections
1980s in Essex